Profundulus is a genus of fish in the family Profundulidae endemic to Mexico and northern Central America. It was regarded as the only genus in the Profundulidae but workers have split the genus and raised a second genus Tlaloc.

Species
These are the currently recognized species in this genus:
 Profundulus balsanus C. G. E. Ahl, 1935 (Balsas killifish) 
 Profundulus candalarius Hubbs, 1924 (Headwater killifish) 
 Profundulus chimalapensis Luis Fernando Del Moral-Flores, Eduardo López-Segovia & Tao Hernández-Arellano, 2020
 Profundulus guatemalensis (Günther, 1866) (Guatemalan killifish)
 Profundulus hildebrandi Miller, 1950 (Chiapas killifish)
 Profundulus kreiseri Matamoros, J. F. Schaefer, C. L. Hernández & Chakrabarty, 2012 (Kreiser's killifish) 
 Profundulus labialis (Günther, 1866) (Largelip killifish) 
 Profundulus mixtlanensis Ornelas-García, Martínez-Ramírez & Doadrio, 2015 
 Profundulus oaxacae (Meek, 1902)
 Profundulus portillorum Matamoros & Schaefer, 2010
 Profundulus punctatus (Günther, 1866) (Oaxaca killifish)

References

Profundulidae
Cyprinodontiformes
Freshwater fish genera
Taxa named by Carl Leavitt Hubbs